Soul Food is the soundtrack to the 1997 film of the same name. It was released on September 16, 1997, through LaFace Records and mainly consisted of R&B music with some hip hop music. The soundtrack was a success, peaking at number 4 on the Billboard 200 and number 1 on the Top R&B/Hip-Hop Albums chart and was certified double Multi-Platinum on February 17, 1998. Four singles charted on the Billboard Hot 100:  "I Care 'Bout You" , "What About Us?" by Total, "We're Not Making Love No More" by Dru Hill, and "A Song for Mama" by Boyz II Men, the latter of which was a number 1 R&B single. The soundtrack was also noted for the fictional quintet group Milestone, consisting of K-Ci & JoJo (of Jodeci), Babyface and his brothers, Kevon and Melvin Edmonds (of After 7), who all came together once for their single and cameo appearance in the film.

Track listing

Charts

Weekly charts

Year-end charts

Certifications

See also
List of Billboard number-one R&B albums of 1997

References

1997 soundtrack albums
LaFace Records soundtracks
Contemporary R&B soundtracks
Hip hop soundtracks
Comedy film soundtracks
Drama film soundtracks